Luigi La Bella (born 25 February 1982) is a former Italian male long-distance runner who competed at one edition of the IAAF World Cross Country Championships at senior level (2005).

References

External links
 
 
 Luigi La Bella at FIDAL 
 

1982 births
Living people
Italian male long-distance runners
Italian male cross country runners